Hans Kraay (14 October 1936 – 27 October 2017) was a Dutch professional footballer who played as a defender. Subsequently, he became well known for his football management skills as well as analysis of matches on Dutch television.

Biography 
Born in Utrecht, Kraay made his professional debut at DOS and also played for Feijenoord.

After his playing career, he became manager at DFC, Elinkwijk, Go Ahead Eagles, Ajax Amsterdam, AZ'67, Edmonton Drillers, Sparta Rotterdam (only two days due to some health trouble), FC Den Haag and Feyenoord Rotterdam. He also served Feyenoord and PSV Eindhoven as a technical director, as well as the NOS and other television channels with his views on football, both commentary and analysis. In 1986, he took place at PSV Eindhoven as manager. The team was first in the League, but in March 1987, he was replaced by Guus Hiddink after a loss against FC Den Bosch on penalties for the KNVB Cup.

Kraay's son Hans Jr. is also a retired professional footballer and television personality.

Kraay also worked for N.E.C. Nijmegen as head of scouting and personal adviser of chairman Marcel Boekhoorn.

Honours 
 1957–58: Eredivisie winner with DOS
 1961–62: Eredivisie winner with Feijenoord
 1964–65: KNVB Cup winner with Feijenoord
 1964–65: Eredivisie winner with Feijenoord

External links 

 

1936 births
2017 deaths
AZ Alkmaar managers
Dutch footballers
Dutch football managers
Dutch association football commentators
Dutch journalists
Eredivisie players
Feyenoord players
FC Dordrecht managers
ADO Den Haag managers
Feyenoord managers
VV DOS players
Footballers from Utrecht (city)
Netherlands international footballers
North American Soccer League (1968–1984) coaches
Association football defenders
Dutch expatriate football managers